Chesterfield Inlet (Inuit: Igluligaarjuk) is an inlet in Kivalliq Region, Nunavut, Canada. It is an arm of northwestern Hudson Bay, and the end point of the Thelon River after its passage through Baker Lake. There are several islands located within the inlet.

The first European here may have been William Moor in 1747 who sent boat parties about 60 miles up the inlet. In 1762 William Christopher followed the whole inlet to Baker Lake.

The Inuit hamlet of the same name, Chesterfield Inlet, is situated near the waterway's mouth. In previous times, the area was home to Aivilingmiut and Qaernermiut.

References

Inlets of Kivalliq Region